Joanne may refer to:

Music
 Joanne (album), 2016 album by Lady Gaga
 "Joanne" (Lady Gaga song), a 2016 song from the album Joanne
 "Joanne" (Michael Nesmith song), a 1970 song from the album Magnetic South
 "Joanne", a song by Cherry Ghost from the 2014 album Herd Runners

Other uses
 Joanne (given name)
 Joanne (Coronation Street), a character from the British television soap opera Coronation Street
JoAnne's Bed and Back, defunct U.S. furniture retailer

See also

 Jo-Ann (disambiguation)
 
 Joanna (disambiguation)
 Joannes (died 425), western Roman emperor
 Jehanne (disambiguation)
 Jeanne (disambiguation)
 Joan (disambiguation)